Marcus Temke (born 26 March 1962) is a Brazilian sailor. He competed at the 1984 Summer Olympics, the 1988 Summer Olympics, and the 1992 Summer Olympics.

References

External links
 

1962 births
Living people
Brazilian male sailors (sport)
Olympic sailors of Brazil
Sailors at the 1984 Summer Olympics – Flying Dutchman
Sailors at the 1988 Summer Olympics – Flying Dutchman
Sailors at the 1992 Summer Olympics – Flying Dutchman
Sportspeople from São Paulo